William David George Wilkinson was an Anglican priest.

Wilkinson was born in 1897 and educated at Jesus College, Oxford. He was ordained deacon in 1920, and priest in 1921. After a curacy at Pembroke Dock he held incumbencies at Crickhowell, Landore and Oystermouth. He was Archdeacon of Brecon from 1955 to 1969.

References

1897 births
Year of death unknown
Archdeacons of Brecon
20th-century Welsh Anglican priests
Alumni of Jesus College, Oxford